The franc is the currency of New Caledonia and Wallis and Futuna. It is subdivided into 100 centimes. Since 1945, it has been part of the CFP franc.

History
Until 1873, the French franc circulated on New Caledonia. That year banknotes were issued specifically for use on the island which circulated along with French coins. In 1945, the CFP franc was introduced, with coins issued for New Caledonia from 1949. The CFP franc is also issued in French Polynesia and was used in the New Hebrides until 1983. Since 1985, banknotes have been issued common to both New Caledonia and French Polynesia, although separate coinages continue.

Coins
In 1949, aluminium 50 centimes, 1 and 2 francs were introduced, followed by aluminium 5 francs in 1952. The 50 centimes was only issued in 1949. In 1967, nickel 10, 20 and 50 francs were introduced, followed by nickel-bronze 100 francs in 1976.

The overall design of the coins has not changed since their introduction and the obverse has always been identical to that of the coins of the French Polynesian franc. The only notable changes were the removal of the text "Union Française" after 1952 and the addition of the initials "I.E.O.M" (Institut d'émission d'Outre-Mer) to the obverse in 1972.

There are currently seven denominations in circulation. Only the 50 centimes has ceased to circulate. The 1, 2 and 5 francs all feature the national bird, the kagu. The 10 francs features a boat of the indigenous tribes. The 20 francs features the heads of three cattle facing left. The 50 and 100 francs feature the same design. They have a hut of the indigenous peoples, with a palm tree behind it, and three palm leaves surrounding.

Banknotes

Between 1873 and 1878, the Compagnie de la Nouvelle Calédonie introduced 5 and 20 franc notes. These were followed in 1875 by notes of the Banque de la Nouvelle Calédonie in denominations of 5, 20, 100 and 500 francs. From the 1890s, the Banque de l'Indochine issued banknotes from Nouméa in denominations of 5, 20, 100 and 500 francs.

Between 1914 and 1923, postage stamps were used to make emergency issue currency. The first issues were pieces of cardboard to which stamps were affixed in denominations of 25 and 50 centimes, 1 and 2 francs, with the 50 centime denominations made from either a single 50 centime stamp or a 15 and a 35 centime stamp. The second issue from 1922 consisted of 25 and 50 centime stamps encapsulated in aluminum.

Between 1918 and 1919, the Nouméa Treasury introduced 50 centime, 1 and 2 franc notes. The Treasury again issued 50 centime, 1 and 2 franc notes in 1942 in the name of the Free French, with 5 and 20 franc notes added in 1943.

In 1969, the Institut d'Emission d'Outre-Mer, Nouméa took over the issuance of paper money, introducing notes for 100, 500, 1000 and 5000 francs. The 100 and 1000 franc notes have two variants. The earlier issue lacked the state title "République française". The 500 and 5000 franc notes have had the state title since their introductions. The 100 franc notes were replaced by coins in 1976.

In 1985, 10,000 franc notes common to all the French Pacific Territories were introduced. These were followed, between 1992 and 1996, by 500, 1000 and 5000 franc notes for all of the French Pacific Territories.

New banknotes were adopted from 20 February 2014, replacing the old notes that had been in use since 1969, which were finally phased out of circulation on 30 September 2014.

See also

CFP franc
French Polynesian franc
New Hebrides franc

Notes

References

External links

Currencies of Oceania
Fixed exchange rate